LaFayette "Fayette" McMullen (May 18, 1805 – November 8, 1880) was a 19th-century politician, driver, teamster and banker from the U.S. state of Virginia and the second appointed Governor of Washington Territory.

Early life and family
Born in Estillville, Virginia, McMullen attended private schools as a child. He was a Virginia driver and teamster, working in the family owned business and driving a coach. He married Mary (Polly) Wood, daughter of the sheriff, in 1826. They had no children.

Career
McMullen became a member of the Senate of Virginia in 1839, serving until 1849. He was elected as a Democrat to the United States House of Representatives in 1848, serving from 1849 to 1857. There, McMullen served as chairman of the Committee on Expenditures in the Department of the Navy from 1851 to 1855 and chairman of the Committee on Expenditures on Public Buildings from 1855 to 1857. McMullen was a delegate to the Democratic National Convention in 1852 and 1856.

McMullen was appointed by President James Buchanan, as Territorial Governor of Washington in 1857, serving until 1859.

McMullen was elected as a Democrat to the Confederate House of Representatives in 1863, serving from 1864 until the crumbling of the Confederacy in 1865. Afterwards, he engaged in agricultural and banking pursuits and unsuccessfully ran for Governor of Virginia in 1878.

Death
McMullen died in a train accident on November 8, 1880 in Wytheville, Virginia, and is interred at Round Hill Cemetery in Marion, Virginia.

References

Further reading
Available online through the Washington State Library's Classics in Washington History collection

External links
 

LaFayette McMullen at The Political Graveyard
Ancestry.com

1805 births
1880 deaths
Democratic Party Virginia state senators
Governors of Washington Territory
Railway accident deaths in the United States
Accidental deaths in Virginia
Members of the Confederate House of Representatives from Virginia
Democratic Party members of the United States House of Representatives from Virginia
19th-century American politicians
People from Gate City, Virginia